Chaetogastra oroensis, synonym Tibouchina oroensis, is a species of plant in the family Melastomataceae. It is endemic to Ecuador.

References

oroensis
Endemic flora of Ecuador
Vulnerable plants
Taxonomy articles created by Polbot